The Herbert M. Baruch Corporation (commonly the Baruch Corporation) was one of the largest general contractors in Southern California during the early to mid-20th century.  During its existence from 1920 to 1955 the company constructed over 500 buildings including Hollywood Bowl, Beverly Hills City Hall, and other major civic and commercial buildings, many of which are now historic buildings.

History
The company was founded by Los Angeles native Herbert M. Baruch (1894-1955) upon his return from military service in World War I.  His family was a prominent pioneer family in Southern California in the early 20th century that originated from Bavaria, and his father Jacob, with his brother Herman,  was a principal in the prominent wholesale grocer Haas, Baruch and Company (one of the other partners was Abraham, father of Walter A. Haas, and this company eventually became Smart & Final).  Mr. Baruch married twice: his first marriage was to Dorothy née Walter (1899-1962) author and educator, and later he married his second wife Rosemary née Bloom (1906-1972), a local socialite.  The first union had two children, Herbert M. Baruch Jr. and Nancy Baruch Smith.  Mr. Baruch was active on several boards including the local Red Cross and Community Chest, an early forerunner to the United Way.  He was also a founding member of the Beach Club, a private social club in Santa Monica.  Despondent over business difficulties and ill health, Mr. Baruch shot himself in his Hollywood Hills residence in 1955.  The business ceased operations the same year.

In 1932 the Baruch Corporation was sued by actress Ann Christy for $100,730 in damages when she was involved in a collision with a ditching machine owned by the company.

Selected works

This is a partial listing of the company's projects:

 Huntington Park Post Office (1925)
 Beverly Hills City Hall (1932)
 The Brentwood Country Mart 1920s
 Cedars of Lebanon Hospital (1930), now part of the Los Angeles Scientology Campus 
 Golden State Mutual Life Insurance Building (1949)
 Harris Newmark Building (1926), now the New Mart Building
 Hollywood Bowl Permanent Seating (1926)
 Los Angeles Philharmonic Auditorium Modernization (1920s)
 Los Angeles Harbor Junior College, now Los Angeles Harbor College
 Mayfair Hotel, Los Angeles (1926)
 Mira Hershey Hall, University of California, Los Angeles (1930s)
 Paramount Studios, Administrative Offices
 Ramona Gardens (1939)
 Valley Municipal Building,  informally "Van Nuys City Hall" (1932)
 William Mead Homes (1942)
 Wilshire Boulevard Temple 1929

Notes

References
 

Defunct companies based in California